Hammerton is a railway station on the Harrogate Line, which runs between  and  via . It is owned by Network Rail and managed by Northern Trains.

Facilities
Like other stations on this line, it is unstaffed so travellers must purchase their tickets on the train or in advance via a smartphone app. There is a waiting room available on the York-bound platform which is open from 06:45–22:30 (10:45-21:45 on Sunday). Both platforms also have shelters. The station features step-free access to both platforms via short ramps and access between platforms is via the level crossing. There is also cycle storage for up to 10 bicycles on the York-bound platform and a small car park to the rear of the station building with parking for 5 vehicles. Digital information screens and a long-line P.A system provide train running information for passengers.

The station building here is still partly in railway use, as it houses the office for the signaller who operates the manual level crossing gates and signalling equipment (the points and signals are worked from a covered ground frame on the platform).

The service arriving from York is timed to arrive before the one from Leeds and Harrogate. This allows for exchange of the token for the single line block between Hammerton and Poppleton.

Services

As of the May 2021 timetable change, the station is served by an hourly service to Leeds and York, with additional services running at peak times. All services are operated by Northern Trains.

References

External links
 
 

Railway stations in North Yorkshire
DfT Category F2 stations
Railway stations in Great Britain opened in 1848
Northern franchise railway stations
Former York and North Midland Railway stations